San Jorge is a village or populated centre in the Durazno Department of central Uruguay.

Geography

This stream flows in a wide vale that floods when the lake has high waters. The nearest populated place to San Jorge is the village Aguas Buenas,  to the southeast.

History
San Jorge was established as a British enclave in the 19th century. The estancia San Jorge was a centre of industrial and agricultural modernization: land was fenced off to secure private property, afforestation took place, there were advances in cattle breeding techniques, and a flour mill was constructed. In 1897, residents of San Jorge were the first British riders to play polo on Uruguayan soil.

Since 2004, the village has held the Encuentro Británico-Oriental, an annual festival featuring a parade, horseback riding contests, music, stands selling handcrafted goods, as well as a tour to historical points of interest.

Population
In 2011 San Jorge had a population of 502.
 
Source: Instituto Nacional de Estadística de Uruguay

References

External links
INE map of San Jorge

Populated places in the Durazno Department